Slade McDowall (born 8 March 1998 in New Zealand) is a New Zealand rugby union player who plays for the New England Free Jacks in Major League Rugby (MLR) and for the  in Super Rugby. His playing position is flanker. 

McDowall was announced in the Highlanders touring squad of South Africa and Argentina in March 2020.

Reference list

External links
itsrugby.co.uk profile

1998 births
New Zealand rugby union players
Living people
Rugby union flankers
Otago rugby union players
Highlanders (rugby union) players
New England Free Jacks players
Manawatu rugby union players